Lej da Staz (Lake of Staz, German: Stazersee) is a lake in the Engadin valley, Grisons, Switzerland. It is close to the Lake St. Moritz, surrounded by the forest of Staz ("Stazerwald").

See also
List of mountain lakes of Switzerland

External links
Photos

Lakes of Graubünden
Staz
Engadin
Celerina/Schlarigna